Jerzy "Gumiś" Podbrożny (born December 17, 1966 in Przemyśl) is a former Polish football striker, one of the top scorers in Polish football history and current manager of Orzeł Campinos.

Biography
Podbrożny led the Polish league in scoring: in 1992 with 20 goals and in 1993 with 25 goals, both times for Lech Poznań. After winning the championship both those years, he transferred to Legia Warsaw, and promptly won the next two titles. In 1996, Podbrożny moved to Spain, first with CP Mérida and then with CD Toledo. He then signed with the Chicago Fire, coming to Major League Soccer in the club's inaugural season in 1998, joining fellow Polish internationals Peter Nowak and Roman Kosecki. Podbrożny went on to help the club to the MLS Cup and U.S. Open Cup double. He played two seasons in MLS, scoring 10 goals and 22 assists in league play. Fans loved him in Chicago for his candour.

Podbrożny was capped six times for the Polish national team.

In 2012 he became manager of amateur club Orzeł Kampinos, a post he has held continuously since.

References

External links

1966 births
Living people
Polish footballers
Lech Poznań players
Legia Warsaw players
CP Mérida footballers
CD Toledo players
Chicago Fire FC players
Zagłębie Lubin players
Pogoń Szczecin players
Amica Wronki players
Wisła Płock players
Widzew Łódź players
La Liga players
Poland international footballers
People from Przemyśl
Ekstraklasa players
Major League Soccer players
Polish expatriate footballers
Expatriate footballers in Spain
Expatriate soccer players in the United States
Polish expatriate sportspeople in the United States
Polish expatriate sportspeople in Spain
Sportspeople from Podkarpackie Voivodeship
Association football forwards